Jeffrey Malcolm Stork (born July 8, 1960 in Longview, Washington) is an American former volleyball player. He was a member of the US national team that won the gold medal in the 1988 Summer Olympics and the bronze medal in the 1992 Summer Olympics.

Stork is currently the head women's volleyball coach at Cal State Northridge.

Son is Daniel Stork

References
 Profile at The Washington Post
 Cal State Northridge Coaching Profile

1960 births
Living people
People from Longview, Washington
American men's volleyball players
Olympiacos S.C. players
Volleyball players at the 1988 Summer Olympics
Volleyball players at the 1992 Summer Olympics
Volleyball players at the 1996 Summer Olympics
Olympic gold medalists for the United States in volleyball
Olympic bronze medalists for the United States in volleyball
Pepperdine Waves men's volleyball players
Medalists at the 1988 Summer Olympics
Medalists at the 1992 Summer Olympics
Pan American Games gold medalists for the United States
Pan American Games medalists in volleyball
Volleyball players at the 1987 Pan American Games
Goodwill Games medalists in volleyball
Competitors at the 1986 Goodwill Games
Medalists at the 1987 Pan American Games